Statistics of Meistaradeildin in the 1974 season.

Overview
It was contested by 6 teams, and Havnar Bóltfelag won the championship.

League table

Results

References
RSSSF

Meistaradeildin seasons
Faroe
Faroe